Flathead may refer to:

Peoples
 Flathead people, one of three tribes of the Confederated Salish and Kootenai Tribes of the Flathead Nation in Montana.
 The Flathead, or Flathead Indian (or Amerindian) tribe more formally known as the  Confederated Salish and Kootenai Tribes of the Flathead Nation
 The Choctaw, a southeastern Native American group also known as the Flatheads

Zoology
 Flat-headed cat, a small wild cat
 Platycephalidae, a family of fish known as flatheads
 Flathead (fish), various species of fish in this family
Pseudaphritis urvillii, species of fish also known as freshwater flathead and marbled flathead
 Flathead catfish

Entertainment
 "Flathead" (song) and "Flathead" EP, both by The Fratellis
 The ruling family of the Great Underground Empire, the location of the Zork adventure game series, most notably in Zork Zero

Crime
 The Flathead gang, a group of bank robbers led by Paul Jaworski.

Technology
 Flat-head screwdriver, a screwdriver designed to turn slotted screws
 Flat-head screw, a screw with a flat top, designed to be installed in a countersunk hole
 Flathead engine, a valve configuration

Places
 Flathead High School, a school in Kalispell, Montana
 Flathead County, Montana
 Flathead Lake, Montana
 Flathead River, Montana
 Flathead National Forest, Montana
 Flathead Indian Reservation, Montana

See also
 Plagiocephaly, a medical condition also known as "flat head syndrome"